Remind Me Tomorrow is the fifth studio album by the American singer-songwriter Sharon Van Etten. It was released on January 18, 2019 on Jagjaguwar. A follow-up to Are We There (2014), the album was written while Van Etten was pregnant with her first child, attending school to obtain a degree in psychology and starring in the Netflix series The OA (2016) and making a cameo in Twin Peaks (2017).

Reception

At Metacritic, which assigns a normalized rating out of 100 to reviews from mainstream critics, Remind Me Tomorrow has received an average score of 86, based on 34 reviews, indicating "universal acclaim". At Pitchfork, Laura Snapes mentions how Van Etten "conjures tempests and explores their subsequent calms", remarking how it is "the peak of her songwriting and her most atmospheric, emotionally piercing album to date." Stephen Thomas Erlewine of AllMusic rated the album four-and-a-half stars out of five, indicating that Van Etten "plumbs the depths of contentedness, setting her satisfaction to a sound that's nominally dark yet strangely comforting and nourishing." Rolling Stone considered Remind Me Tomorrow as her finest album for including styles ranging from "expansive electro groove" to "trip-hop rumination" and singer "Siouxsie [Sioux]-style wails".

Accolades

Track listing

Personnel
All personnel credits adapted from Remind Me Tomorrows album notes.

Performers
Sharon Van Etten – vocals , piano , organ 
Heather Woods Broderick – backing vocals , synthesizer , electric piano 
Zachary Dawes – bass , synthesizer 
McKenzie Smith – drums , percussion 
Luke Reynolds – lap steel guitar , guitar , tape loops , synthesizer , keyboards , celesta , bass 
John Congleton – synthesizer , drone , drum programming , percussion , organ , tape loops , drum machine , theremin , loops , sequencer 
Jamie Stewart – synthesizer , vocals , guitar , bells , percussion 
Lars Horntveth – guitar , synthesizer , woodwinds , piano , celesta 
Brian Reitzell – drums , organ , percussion , drone , cymbal 
Joey Waronker – drums 
Stella Mozgawa – drums 

Technical personnel
John Congleton – production, engineering, mixing
Sean Cook – additional engineering
Tyler Karmen – additional engineering
Greg Calbi – mastering
JN-H – lacquer cutting

Design personnel
Nathaniel David Utesch – design, layout
Katherine Dieckmann – photography 
Rob Houston – photography 
Maya Judd – photography 
Len Prince – photographer

Chart positions

References

External links

2019 albums
Albums produced by John Congleton
Jagjaguwar albums
Sharon Van Etten albums